Pensacola station is a former train station in Pensacola, Florida. It was served by Amtrak, the national railroad passenger system. The station served as a replacement for the former Louisville and Nashville Passenger Station and Express Building. Service has been suspended since Hurricane Katrina struck Pensacola in 2005.

References

External links

Pensacola Amtrak Station (USA Rail Guide -- Train Web)

Former Amtrak stations in Florida
Railway stations in the United States opened in 1993
Railway stations closed in 2005
Pensacola, Florida
Transportation buildings and structures in Escambia County, Florida
1993 establishments in Florida